Ashford School is a coeducational independent boarding and day school in East Hill, Ashford, Kent. There are 480 students in the senior school (ages 11 to 18) and 360 in the prep school (ages 3 to 11).

The school is owned and run by the United Church Schools Trust and is a member of the Headmasters' and Headmistresses' Conference (HMC). Michael Hall has been headmaster since September 2018.

Ashford School was a Good Schools Guide award winner in 2011 and was voted one of the country's top five boarding schools the Archant Good Schools Show. The School was endorsed as outstandingly successful in every category during an inspection by Independent Schools Inspectorate in 2014.

Boarding starts at age 10 at Ashford School when pupils can choose a range of boarding options: flexible, weekly or full. The school has 3 boarding houses: Junior boarding house Brooke & Refuge and senior boarding houses Brabourne and Alfred.

History
The school was founded in 1898 by Muriel Thimann, who opened a small women's school in Queens Road, Ashford. The school moved to Wellesley Road in 1903 and then to two houses in the High Street in 1905 for a larger premises. In 1910, Anne Edwards bought the school and renamed it "the Modern High School for Girls". The school expanded into another, adjacent house in the High Street and then moved to bigger premises on East Hill in 1913. In 2005, it merged with Friars Prep School in Great Chart and in 2006, boys were admitted in some year groups. Ashford School is now a fully co-educational school from the age of 3 to 18 offering boarding and day facilities. Mike Buchanan was first appointed the headmaster of Ashford School in February 2005.

Space shuttle experiment
In 1992, a science experiment designed by four girls at the school flew on the Space Shuttle on flight STS-47. The experiment had been designed in 1985 by the girls who had won a competition organised by Independent Television News. The chemical garden experiment was successful but the Liesegang rings failed to operate correctly due to a friction in parts of the mechanism. On their return, they were displayed in the London Science Museum. The seven-year delay had been caused by the Space Shuttle Challenger disaster which occurred in 1986 shortly before the intended flight.

Ashford School International Centre

The Ashford School International Centre (ASIC) opened in September 2015. This section of the school has been designed to meet the needs of non-native English speaking pupils.

ASIC is an 18th-century Grade II listed building which has undergone a multimillion-pound refurbishment, providing classrooms alongside boarding rooms. International pupils complete IGCSE there before joining the rest of the school.

Notable alumni

 Petronella Barker (born 1942), actress
 Liv Boeree, model, TV presenter and poker player
 Sally Brampton, journalist, writer and magazine editor
 Louise Burfitt-Dons, writer and campaigner
 Lucy Cooke, National Geographic explorer, documentary producer/presenter, author and zoologist
 Wendy Cope, poet
 Jane Druker, Editor at Large: Fit & Well and contributor to Woman & Home
 Sophie Montagne, adventurer, inspirational speaker, member of the Ice Maiden Expedition
 Sally Preisig, voice-over artist and puppeteer (Tweenies, Playdays)
 Diana Speed, Radio 4 newsreader
 Anna Turley, former Labour MP and Chairwoman of the Co-operative Party since 8 June 2019
 Fleur Willson, Deputy Ambassador, British Embassy Tripoli

Heads of Ashford School

 Muriel Thimann 1898–1910
 Anne Edwards 1910–1928
 Lilian Brake 1928–1955
 Mary Nightingale 1955–1971
 Sanche Thompson 1972–1984
 Tatiana Macaire 1984–1992
 Patrica Metham 1992–1997
 Jane Burnett 1997–2000
 Paula Holloway 2000–2005
 Michael Buchanan 2005–2018
 Michael Hall 2018–Present

References

External links
School website
Stats from www.bbc.co.uk
Ofsted

Private schools in Kent
Member schools of the Headmasters' and Headmistresses' Conference
Educational institutions established in 1898
United Learning schools
1898 establishments in England
Ashford, Kent
Church of England private schools in the Diocese of Canterbury